The Oxford Valley Mall is a two-story shopping mall, managed and 85.5 percent-owned by the Simon Property Group, that is located next to the Sesame Place amusement park near 
Langhorne in Middletown Township, Bucks County, Pennsylvania. Its department stores are JCPenney and Macy's. There is a food court on the second floor, which was originally the second floor of a Woolworth. An office building called One Oxford Valley is located next to the mall.

With 130 stores, Oxford Valley Mall is currently the tenth largest shopping mall in Pennsylvania.

History
The Oxford Valley Mall was developed by The Kravco Company and opened in 1973. In 1986, the Gimbels store was converted to Stern's after Allied Stores purchased seven Gimbels locations in the Philadelphia area. That same year, Bamberger's became Macy's. In 1989, Sears replaced Stern's after the latter closed several stores in the Philadelphia area. The mall underwent a renovation in 1990. In 1992, a separate, 10 screen movie theater was added behind Sears (4 new auditoriums were added in 2004).  In 1995, the mall opened its food court on the second floor, replacing what had been the second floor of a Woolworth store. In addition, the mall replaced the spiral pedestrian ramp and fountain with a glass-enclosed elevator, upgraded the air conditioning system, and extensively renovated the JCPenney and Sears stores. All fountains were eventually removed with only the outdoor one remaining. The same year, Wanamaker's was converted to Hecht's. In 1997, Hecht's became Strawbridge's after its parent company, May Department Stores, acquired the Strawbridge's chain. In 2006, the Strawbridge's store closed as a result of Federated Department Stores acquiring May Department Stores, with Boscov's taking over the former store. The Boscov's store closed in 2008 as part of their restructuring. On October 15, 2018, Sears announced that its store would be closing as part of a plan to close 142 stores nationwide as a result of the company filing for Chapter 11 bankruptcy. The store closed on January 7, 2019. This left Macy's and JCPenney as the only anchors. 

In August 2019, a local news agency reported that Simon Property Group and multiple other related entities have proposed a plan to redevelop the mall and the surrounding property into a mixed use center, including the addition of a 600 unit high-end apartment complex in place of the former Wanamaker's/Boscov's anchor; that would include studio-2 bedroom units, a fitness center, indoor and outdoor common spaces, dog park, pools, full-time management, maintenance, and concierge services like dog walking on site. Other possible additions include new eateries, a “lifestyle complex,” new retailers, and refreshed office space. According to sources, an area of the parking lot will be used for the possible developments. In December 2022, the long-vacant Wanamaker's/Boscov's anchor building was demolished to make way for future redevelopment.

References

External links
Oxford Valley Mall official website

Simon Property Group
Shopping malls in Pennsylvania
Shopping malls established in 1973
Buildings and structures in Bucks County, Pennsylvania
Tourist attractions in Bucks County, Pennsylvania
1973 establishments in Pennsylvania